Graptasura is a genus of moths in the subfamily Arctiinae. The genus was erected by George Hampson in 1900.

Species
Graptasura polygrapha (Felder, 1874)
Graptasura trilacunata Holloway, 2001
Graptasura mesilau Holloway, 2001

References

External links

Lithosiini